Lesbian, gay, bisexual, and transgender (LGBT) persons in the British Virgin Islands face legal challenges not experienced by non-LGBT residents. Same-sex sexual activity has been legal in the British Virgin Islands since 2001.

Law regarding same-sex sexual activity
Before 2001, anal sex and oral sex for both heterosexuals and male homosexuals were criminal offences, referred to as "buggery" under the British Virgin Islands Criminal Code. Lesbian activity has never been illegal. Age of consent is set at 16, regardless of gender or sexual orientation.

Sexual acts between two consenting adults in private were expressly decriminalized by an Order in Council in the British Virgin Islands (and other British Overseas Territories) by the British Government pursuant to Sections 3(1) and 3(7) of the Caribbean Territories (Criminal Law) Order, 2000. According to section 4 of the order, the law has retrospective effect. There are two exceptions to the law: group sex and sex in public remain criminal offences and may also lead to charges under gross indecency and other minor sexual offence laws.

As a British Overseas Territory, the British Virgin Islands Government is required to comply with their obligations under international human rights instruments. Specifically, this includes an adherence to the European Convention on Human Rights, which highlight a responsibility to ensure non-discrimination and equality. The European Convention on Human Rights has been recognised by the courts as having legal effect in the jurisdiction.

Recognition of same-sex relationships

Same-sex marriages and civil unions are not legal in the British Virgin Islands. The British Virgin Islands is an extremely religious society, and no discussion relating to legalisation has yet occurred in the House of Assembly.

In 2015, Premier Orlando Smith, whilst affirming his personal opposition to same-sex marriage, indicated that he is open to public consultation on the issue. However, the Marriage (Amendment) Act 2017 made no provision for same-sex marriages, and politicians speaking in the House of Assembly took time to comment on the absence of such provisions and express hostility to same-sex marriage and LGBT people more broadly.

Church leaders have indicated hostility towards the possibility of legalisation, and political leaders have taken an unsympathetic approach in public. Her Majesty's Government has confirmed that it will not impose recognition of same-sex marriages in the British Virgin Islands by way of an Order in Council.

In 2021 a local couple sought a judicial review challenging the constitutionality of the refusal to recognise their same-sex marriage (celebrated in the United Kingdom). The proceeding was stayed pending the outcome of appeals to the Privy Council in two cases involving Bermuda and the Cayman Islands, though evidentiary proceedings were continued in July 2022 as the government defended the island's statute banning same-sex marriage in the court. In December 2022 the Premier of the British Virigin Islands Natalio Wheatley announced the government would seek to pass legislation authorising it to hold a referendum on same-sex marriage and expansion of domestic partnership rights in 2023.

Discrimination protections
The 2007 Constitution prohibits discrimination against people on the basis of sexual orientation:
Whereas every person in the Virgin Islands is entitled to the fundamental rights and freedoms of the individual;
Whereas those fundamental rights and freedoms are enjoyed without distinction of any kind, such as sex, race, colour, language, religion, political or other opinion, national, ethnic or social origin, association with a national minority, property, family relations, economic status, disability, age, birth, sexual orientation, marital or other status, subject only to prescribed limitations;

"Discriminatory" means affording different treatment to different persons on any ground such as sex, race, colour, language, religion, political or other opinion, national, ethnic or social origin, association with a national minority, property, family relations, economic status, disability, age, birth, sexual orientation, marital or other status

Living conditions
The British Virgin Islands is a conservative and religious society. Open displays of affection between same-sex partners may offend, and LGBT people generally keep their sexual orientation a secret and stay in the closet. There are reports of same-sex couples and LGBT people being harassed and even physically attacked. Some of these violent attacks have been justified or excused by locals as simply "following the Bible".

Summary table

See also

Human rights in the British Virgin Islands
LGBT rights in the Americas
LGBT rights in the United Kingdom
Recognition of same-sex unions in the British Overseas Territories
LGBT rights in the United States Virgin Islands

References

Rights
British Virgin Islands
Politics of the British Virgin Islands
British Virgin Islands law
British Virgin Islands
Human rights in the British Virgin Islands
British Virgin